Ecole Globale International Girls' School is a private international boarding school for girls, situated in the foothills of the Himalayas in Dehradun, Uttarakhand,  India.

History 
Ecole Globale was founded in 2013 by Amarjeet Juneja. This is amongst the best Schools in Dehardun was started to provide college-preparatory education to Girls students from India and from overseas. There are over 300 students at the school.

Affiliation 
Ecole Globale International Girls' School is affiliated with the Cambridge International Examinations (CIE) and the Central Board of Secondary Education (CBSE).

Academics
Ecole Globale offers education from grades 4th to 12th. Students have a choice to study science or commerce after Class 8th. The school is located on a  campus.

Ecole Globale International Girls' School was awarded with the National Excellence Award at the 3rd National School Excellence Awards Ceremony hosted by Brain feed in New Delhi.

Sports 
Students of Ecole Globale International Schools' students participated with other schools in different state level Competitions.

References

External links 
 Official website

International schools in India
Boarding schools in India
Girls' schools in Uttarakhand
High schools and secondary schools in Uttarakhand
Schools in Dehradun
Educational institutions established in 2012
Schools in Uttarakhand
Girls boarding schools
2012 establishments in Uttarakhand